Haytham Tambal (born November 28, 1978 in Sudan) is a former Sudanese football striker.  He is the all-time Sudan national football team top scorer. In 2008 in the Sudanese league he scored 21 goals in 20 games. He used to play rivals Al-Hilal Club and Al-Merrikh SC and made a single appearance for South African club, Orlando Pirates.

Honours

clubs
Al-Hilal Club
Sudan Premier League
Champion (3):2003, 2004, 2005
Sudan Cup
Winners  (1):2004
Al-Merrikh SC
Sudan Premier League
Champion(1):2008
Sudan Cup
Winner(3):2007, 2008, 2010

National
Sudan national football team
CECAFA Cup
Champions(1):2006

International goals

References

External links 

1978 births
Association football forwards
Living people
Orlando Pirates F.C. players
Sudan international footballers
2008 Africa Cup of Nations players
Sudanese expatriate footballers
Sudanese footballers
2011 African Nations Championship players
Al-Hilal Club (Omdurman) players
Al-Merrikh SC players
People from Omdurman
Sudan A' international footballers
Sudanese expatriate sportspeople in South Africa
Expatriate soccer players in South Africa